Live Forever is the second solo mixtape by American singer/rapper Lil Peep. It was released on December 2, 2015. It was released two months after his first mixtape, Lil Peep; Part One, which was released in September 2015. The mixtape was preceded by two singles: "Flannel" and “Haunt U”, and three additional singles were issued posthumously. The mixtape was later re-released on the seventh anniversary of the mixtape's release in 2022.

Background 
A music video for the track, "Live Forever" was released on December 16, 2015.

Mysticphonk, producer of the songs "Angeldust" and "Haunt U" would re-release the two songs as singles and upon Peep's passing in late 2017, putting them on his EP titled 2016, a compilation of songs he produced for the late rapper.

Track listing 

Notes
 "Angeldust" samples the loop "Lovely Guitar Loop Clean" by djole94hns.
 "Pick Me Up" samples Yasmin De Laine's cover of "Climbing Up the Walls" by Radiohead.
 "Nuts" samples "Bright Lights", from the Jesus Camp soundtrack by Force Theory.
 "Haunt U" samples the loop "If Time Could Stand Still" by Minor2Go.
 "Vibe" samples "Eastern Smell of Death" by Siculicidium.
 "Live Forever" samples "Just a Boy" by Walleater.
 "Flannel" samples "The Drowning Man" by The Cure.
 "2008" samples "Coma White" by Marilyn Manson.
 "Give U the Moon" samples "Level Head" by Wind in Sails.

Charts

References 

2015 mixtape albums
Lil Peep albums
Self-released albums